Berceşti may refer to several villages in Romania:

 Berceşti, a village in Cozieni Commune, Buzău County
 Berceşti, a village in the town of Novaci, Gorj County